Franco Agustín Romero (born 23 April 2000) is an Argentine professional footballer who plays as a central midfielder for Estudiantes.

Career
Romero joined the youth system of Estudiantes in 2005, following a short spell with Inter de Villa Elvira. After fifteen years in their academy, the central midfielder was moved into the club's first-team in 2020–21 under caretaker manager Leandro Desábato. Romero was on the bench in early November for Copa de la Liga Profesional defeats to San Lorenzo and Argentinos Juniors, which preceded his senior debut arriving later that month in the same competition against Aldosivi; he was substituted on in place of Iván Gómez midway through the second half of a home defeat.

Career statistics
.

Notes

References

External links

2000 births
Living people
Footballers from La Plata
Argentine footballers
Association football midfielders
Argentine Primera División players
Estudiantes de La Plata footballers